The Tsintu River is a river in the Northwest Territories, Canada. It is a tributary of the Mackenzie River.

See also
List of rivers of the Northwest Territories

References
Gazetteer of the Northwest Territories

Rivers of the Northwest Territories